Ankeveen is a village in the Dutch province of North Holland. It is a part of the municipality of Wijdemeren, and lies about 5 km west of Bussum.

The village was first mentioned in 1344 as Tankenveen, and means "peat excavation of Tanke (person)". Ankeveen is a stretched out peat concession village.

The buitenplaats Berg en Vaart was built near Ankeveen between 1779 and 1782 by an Amsterdam wine merchant. It is surrounded by a large park designed in the 18th century.

Until 1966, Ankeveen was a separate municipality. In 2002, it became part of the municipality of Wijdemeren.

Gallery

References

Populated places in North Holland
Former municipalities of North Holland
Wijdemeren